The 1990–91 NBA season  was the Jazz's 17th season in the National Basketball Association, and 12th season in Salt Lake City, Utah. Early into the season, the Jazz traveled to Japan to play their first two games against the Phoenix Suns at the Tokyo Metropolitan Gymnasium. With the off-season acquisition of All-Star guard Jeff Malone from the Sacramento Kings, who acquired him from the Washington Bullets in a three-team trade, the Jazz continued to play sweet music in the regular season with a 26–12 start, and held a 30–16 record at the All-Star break. They ended up falling one game short of the Midwest Division title with another stellar record of 54–28. They made their eighth consecutive trip to the playoffs.

Karl Malone averaged 29.0 points and 11.8 rebounds per game, and was named to the All-NBA First Team, and finished in fifth place in Most Valuable Player voting, while John Stockton averaged 17.2 points, led the league with 14.2 assists, and contributed 2.9 steals per game, while being named to the All-NBA Third Team, and the NBA All-Defensive Second Team. In addition, Jeff Malone finished second on the team in scoring with 18.6 points per game, while sixth man Thurl Bailey provided the team with 12.4 points and 5.0 rebounds per game, second-year guard Blue Edwards contributed 9.3 points per game, and Mark Eaton provided with 8.3 rebounds and 2.4 blocks per game. Malone and Stockton were both selected for the 1991 NBA All-Star Game.

In the Western Conference First Round of the playoffs, the Jazz defeated the 4th-seeded Phoenix Suns in four games, but lost in the Western Conference Semi-finals to the Portland Trail Blazers in five games. This was also their final season playing at the Salt Palace. Following the season, Darrell Griffith was released to free agency and then retired.

Draft picks

Roster

Regular season

Season standings

y - clinched division title
x - clinched playoff spot

z - clinched division title
y - clinched division title
x - clinched playoff spot

Record vs. opponents

Game log

Playoffs

|- align="center" bgcolor="#ccffcc"
| 1
| April 25
| @ Phoenix
| W 129–90
| Karl Malone (27)
| Karl Malone (10)
| John Stockton (15)
| Arizona Veterans Memorial Coliseum14,487
| 1–0
|- align="center" bgcolor="#ffcccc"
| 2
| April 27
| @ Phoenix
| L 92–102
| Jeff Malone (23)
| Karl Malone (14)
| John Stockton (11)
| Arizona Veterans Memorial Coliseum14,487
| 1–1
|- align="center" bgcolor="#ccffcc"
| 3
| April 30
| Phoenix
| W 107–98
| Karl Malone (32)
| Mike Brown (11)
| John Stockton (12)
| Salt Palace12,616
| 2–1
|- align="center" bgcolor="#ccffcc"
| 4
| May 2
| Phoenix
| W 101–93
| Karl Malone (38)
| Karl Malone (13)
| John Stockton (13)
| Salt Palace12,616
| 3–1
|-

|- align="center" bgcolor="#ffcccc"
| 1
| May 7
| @ Portland
| L 97–117
| John Stockton (23)
| Karl Malone (16)
| John Stockton (16)
| Memorial Coliseum12,884
| 0–1
|- align="center" bgcolor="#ffcccc"
| 2
| May 9
| @ Portland
| L 116–118
| Karl Malone (40)
| Karl Malone (16)
| John Stockton (12)
| Memorial Coliseum12,884
| 0–2
|- align="center" bgcolor="#ccffcc"
| 3
| May 11
| Portland
| W 107–101
| Karl Malone (30)
| Karl Malone (21)
| John Stockton (15)
| Delta Center12,616
| 1–2
|- align="center" bgcolor="#ffcccc"
| 4
| May 12
| Portland
| L 101–104
| Karl Malone (31)
| Karl Malone (12)
| John Stockton (16)
| Delta Center12,616
| 1–3
|- align="center" bgcolor="#ffcccc"
| 5
| May 14
| @ Portland
| L 96–103
| Karl Malone (26)
| K. Malone, Eaton (8)
| John Stockton (14)
| Memorial Coliseum12,884
| 1–4
|-

Player statistics

Season

Playoffs

Player Statistics Citation:

Awards and records
 Karl Malone, All-NBA First Team
 John Stockton, All-NBA Third Team
 John Stockton, NBA All-Defensive Second Team

Transactions

References

See also
 1990-91 NBA season

Utah Jazz seasons
Utah
Utah
Utah